Gustav Adolf (Adolph) Heideck, from 1836 von Heideck (born Dessau, 25 April 1787 - died there 23 January 1856) was a German painter. A classmate of Friedrich and Ferdinand Olivier in Dessau, he studied at the Hauptschule there with Carl Wilhelm Kolbe. Apart from this he is not known to have any formal training, and is referred to in documentation as an "Autodidakt" and "Dilettant", or amateur, in painting and etching. From 1813 to 1820 he was in Rome, and he returned there in 1837. He also traveled to Terni and to Naples, and is known to have been in Olevano in 1820.

References
Philip Conisbee, Sarah Faunce, and Jeremy Strick. In the Light of Italy: Corot and Early Open-Air Painting. New Haven; Yale University Press, 1996.

19th-century German painters
German male painters
1787 births
1856 deaths
19th-century German male artists